A goujon is a small strip of meat taken from underside of the muscular fish tail or chicken breast, sometimes coated in breadcrumbs and deep fried.

References

Deep fried foods
Fish dishes
Meat dishes